Randa is a town in central Djibouti located in Tadjoura. It is the capital of the Randa District. The settlement lies in a small valley, north of the Day Forest National Park in the Goda Mountains.

History
Randa has played an important role in trade between the port of Tadjoura, and the hinterland, once dynamic and prosperous possessing a well on its bed of wadi which crossed it and has one of the mildest climates in Djibouti. The beginning of the civil conflict in December 1991, when the FRUD rebels captured Randa and neighbouring towns. However, the Djiboutian Army re-took the town in October 1993.

Overview
The settlement lies in a small valley, north of the RN-11 road which leaves the coast to the south to head west towards Dorra.  It is within  of the Day Forest National Park in the Goda Mountains to the south.

Geography
Randa's altitude gives the settlement and the surrounding area a milder climate than the Tadjoura coastal area, where the weather is typically hotter. A river runs through the town. Often dry, the watercourse divides Randa in half.  The surrounding mountains to the west are high and jagged, lengthening journeys in that direction.

Wildlife
Due to the fertility of the region, experienced in many years, wild mammals such as gazelle and mountain goats migrate to the area either to breed or to live and graze on the grassland savannah.

Climate
The town seldom experiences either hot or cold weather, due to the high altitude. The settlement has relatively high average precipitation for the region, twice that of Tadjourah city for example. Average monthly temperatures in Randa range from 14°C in the months of December and January to 34.7°C in June.

Randa has a hot semi-arid climate (BSh) in Köppen-Geiger system.

References

External links
Satellite map at Maplandia.com

Populated places in Djibouti
Tadjourah Region